The Skrulls are a fictional race of extraterrestrial shapeshifters appearing in American comic books published by Marvel Comics. The Skrulls first appeared in Fantastic Four #2 and were created by Stan Lee and Jack Kirby. They originated from the planet Skrullos and their empire is located in the Andromeda Galaxy. Their infiltration of Earth was a major event in the Marvel Comics universe as shown in the crossover event Secret Invasion.

The Skrulls have made numerous appearances in animated television and video games before making their live-action cinematic debut in the Marvel Cinematic Universe film, Captain Marvel (2019). Skrulls have also appeared in Spider-Man: Far From Home (2019) and the Disney+ series WandaVision and What If...? (both 2021), and will return in the upcoming series Secret Invasion (2023).

Publication history

The Skrulls first appeared in Fantastic Four #2 and were created by Stan Lee and Jack Kirby. The Skrulls next appear in Fantastic Four #18. The four who impersonated the members of the Fantastic Four next appear in The Avengers #92. The concept of the Skrulls would be explored and used throughout multiple storylines, spin-off comics, and derivative projects.

Fictional history
Millions of years ago, in the main Marvel continuity,  the Celestials perform genetic experiments on the reptilian ancestors of the Skrulls, resulting in three branches of Skrulls: the Prime, the Deviants and the Eternals. Eventually, the three branches battled with one another and the Deviant branch – due to possessing the innate ability to shapeshift – were triumphant, and wiped out all members of the other two races until only two were left: the Skrull Eternal Kly'bn, and the Prime Skrull of the original non-Deviant Skrull race. Kly'bn implored them to spare his life, as killing him would kill part of their heritage. The Deviants' leader Sl'gur't eventually fell in love with Kly'bn, with the two eventually becoming the gods of the Skrull pantheon. Taking the name the Prime Skrull, the last original Skrull escaped to Earth in the 20th century and later became a member of the Underground Legion. From that point on, the Skrulls began to expand their territory. The Deviant branch later split into two more groups, the modern Skrulls and an anomaly called the Dire Wraiths.

The Skrulls originated from the planet Skrullos, and were originally a mercantile civilization, primarily interested in free trade and willing to share their technology with all races they deemed worthy. When they encountered a new race, they simply transformed themselves to resemble that race. The Skrull Empire that resulted from these contacts was based on free trade and mutual cooperation.

Kree–Skrull War

Eventually, the Skrulls developed long-distance space travel; a great tour of the universe was undertaken, led by Emperor Dorrek. Finally, the Skrull delegation reached the planet Hala, home to the then-barbaric Kree and the peaceful Cotati, and held a contest to determine which of the races would represent Hala to the Skrull Empire. Seventeen members of each race were taken to different uninhabited planetoids, where they were left with sufficient supplies for one year. At the end of that period, whichever group had done the most with themselves would be adjudged the most worthy. The Kree were taken to Earth's Moon where they built a great city, while the Cotati were taken to another barren world in a different solar system and used their abilities to create a beautiful park. Realizing that the Cotati were going to win, the enraged Kree killed all of them. When the Kree revealed that they had solved the question of who would represent Hala to the Skrulls by destroying their opposition, the Skrull delegates were appalled and vowed that Hala would forever be banned from their circle of favored worlds—so the Kree massacred them as well, took over the Skrull landing spaceship by force, and developed their own technology from it.

Because of the immense distances involved, decades passed before the Skrulls learned of the Kree's activities. By this time, however, it was too late. The Kree were now advanced and audacious enough to attack the Skrulls in their home galaxy. During the millennia that followed, the Kree aggression forced the Skrulls to become a militaristic civilization, and the Skrulls eventually developed the vicious streak needed to conduct intergalactic war. Their entire culture was remade in the warrior image. The Kree–Skrull War continued for thousands of years with only brief interruptions. The Skrull Throneworld is later moved from Skrullos to the more central Tarnax IV, with their empire encompassing over fifty worlds. The Skrulls also created the first Cosmic Cube, which later became the Shaper of Worlds; the Shaper related that, upon attaining self-awareness, he lashed out blindly, destroying two-thirds of the Skrull Empire and casting the civilization back into barbarism (suggesting this occurred before the war with the Kree broke out).

The Kree Accuser Ronan had wrested control of the Kree Empire from the Supreme Intelligence and attacked the Skrulls, reigniting hostilities. The Avengers become involved once the Super-Skrull kidnapped Captain Marvel and, in turn, they battled a Kree Sentry robot, three of the four original Skrulls that had fought the Fantastic Four, S.H.I.E.L.D. agents, rogue Inhumans and legions of Skrulls. The Supreme Intelligence ended the immediate conflict by revealing to the Avengers' ally Rick Jones that he had vast mental potential, which was then used to freeze all combatants in place. The Supreme Intelligence announced that, while the Kree and Skrulls had reached genetic dead ends, the human race displayed incredible untapped potential. It is revealed years later that the conflict produced a Kree-Skrull hybrid, the Hulkling, who was the child of one-time lovers Captain Marvel and the Skrull Princess Anelle.

Empire-changing events
The Skrulls became aware of Earth when they discovered a space warp linking Earth and Throneworld. Later, they discovered Earth possesses an equidistant link to Hala. They see Earth as a world to conquer, but they are content to hold off a full invasion. Because of their caution, the Skrulls have sent only a handful of scout warriors to infiltrate Earth, but failed to take into account the presence of the modern superhero.

In 1958, Skrulls attempted to sabotage Earth's space program. They battled the 3-D Man, and set the Cold Warrior against the 3-D Man. Later, a small scouting party used their shape-shifting powers to impersonate the Fantastic Four, committing crimes so the country would turn against the Fantastic Four, the only ones with the power to stop them at the time. But the Fantastic Four were able to locate the Skrulls and tricked their leaders into believing the Earth was full of threats. The fleet left and Mr. Fantastic made three of the four Skrulls that were left behind shape-shift into cows and he hypnotized them to remember nothing about their true heritage.

In retaliation, the Skrull Emperor Dorrek VII dispatched Kl'rt, a Skrull who was made into the Super-Skrull, to Earth to defeat the Fantastic Four. Kl'rt possessed the combined powers of the entire Fantastic Four (in addition to shape-shifting and hypnotism), and he held the team at bay until Mister Fantastic discovered the source of his power and used a miniature device to jam the ray, before the Human Torch imprisoned him inside a crater. The Super-Skrull posed as the jailed Dr. Franklin Storm, after transporting him to the Skrull Throneworld, and battled the Fantastic Four as the Invincible Man. Another Skrull, ultimately caused the death of Dr. Storm by attaching a bomb to his chest before he was transported back, but Storm turned to the floor, saving the Fantastic Four. The Fantastic Four later traveled to Tarnax IV and found the Skrull responsible for the murder of Susan and Johnny Storm's father (which turned out to be the Skrull Warlord Morrat). Skrulls were involved in other events, such as sending the Super-Skrull to battle Captain Mar-Vell, and abducting the Thing as a contestant in the Skrull Games.

Later, the cosmic being Uatu the Watcher adjudicates a duel between champions from both races: Colonel Bel-Dann of the Kree and Warlord Raksor of the Skrulls. After one year of conflict, the duel remained deadlocked and was ultimately abandoned, with no resolution. Years later, during a conflict with Xandar that included the Fantastic Four and the Champions of Xandar, Emperor Dorrek VII's wife Empress R'klll staged a coup and killed him to become ruling Empress.

Empress R'klll's reign was short-lived, however, as the greatest blow to the Skrulls arrived in the form of the World Devourer Galactus. After his Herald Nova annihilated the Skrull fleet, Galactus devoured Tarnax IV, killing 7 billion Skrulls, including R'klll and Princess Anelle. With the destruction of the central government, the Skrull Empire collapsed into hundreds of bickering factions. Their galaxy was filled with Governors who declared themselves to be Emperor of the Skrulls and soon, a civil war began. The Shi'ar maintained a heavy presence in the former Empire as well, constantly dealing with pockets of resistance.

Second Kree–Skrull War
Later, Reed Richards discovered that yet another Governor-turned-Emperor, Zabyk, had created a genetics bomb, which, when it exploded, made all the Skrulls lose their shape-shifting abilities. Whatever form they were in, they were stuck in at the time of the explosion.

In desperation, since without their shape-shifting powers they were vulnerable, they managed to kidnap the herald of Galactus Nova in an attempt to get Galactus to destroy Kree worlds for them. Their plot failed when the Silver Surfer helped Galactus rescue Nova in exchange for his freedom from Earth.

When the Celestials made an appearance, this scared the Skrulls into starting a second war with the Kree to show they were not powerless. The attack was first made by Kylor, one of five governors claiming to be Emperor. He had a spy in the Kree Empire, Nenora, who gave him the early edge. They tried to hide their secret weakness at all costs from the Kree.

Kylor was eventually betrayed by Nenora, as was the entire Skrull race. She assumed power of the Empire and wished to keep it for herself. It was Empress S'byll who stepped up to control the Skrulls and finish the war. She was able to resurrect the Super-Skrull and he returned to find the empire in shambles. They tricked the Silver Surfer into attacking a Badoon fleet, which he was not aware were allied with the Kree. Since the Kree waged war on the Surfer, he allied himself with the Skrulls to save Zenn-La from destruction.

To restore their powers, the Super-Skrull's DNA needed to be transferred to S'byll, because only a female could spread the ability to the other Skrulls. The Surfer helped them to power a machine that would return the Empress' shape-shifting abilities. The device was successful. With this power, she was able to restore every Skrull she touched and became the true Empress of the Skrulls.

She and the Super-Skrull waged war with the Kree with the help of the Silver Surfer. She replaced the Super-Skrull with Captain Reptyl and he helped to change her into an emotionless reptile. But Reptyl was betrayed by one of his own and the Skrull fleet was utterly destroyed by the Kree. S'byll and the Silver Surfer went alone to attack the Kree homeworld of Hala.

Gaining the knowledge that Nenora was actually a Skrull gave them the advantage. S'byll gave her shape-shifting abilities back to her, crippling her and showing the Kree her true self. A peace treaty was created.

The Skrulls eventually broke that peace treaty, as they kept their military drive and prefer to fight rather than negotiate. Among the other races contained within the Skrull Empire are the Druff, Guna, Kallusina, Morani, Pheragot, Queega, Tekton, and Yirbek races. Other races remain independent, whether through treaties or open resistance. Such races include the Clegrimites, Gegku, Krylorians, Wilameanis, and Xandarians. The Skrull-Xandarian war with the Xandarians recently ended with the destruction of Xandar by the supervillainess Nebula.

Other activities
Skrulls are, meanwhile, involved in numerous other activities. They were revealed to have conquered a medieval planet and abandoned it after its inhabitants perished. Skrull Prime Ten battled the Fantastic Four and Captain Mar-Vell. The Skrulls sent their own representative to witness the fate of the Phoenix, at her trial by the Shi'ar. There is a lone appearance of Queen Akilll of the Skrulls. A lone Skrull poisoned Vera Gantor to force the Avengers to seek the Resurrection Stone on his behalf. The Skrulls sent General Zedrao to give the dying Captain Mar-Vell the Royal Skrull Medal of Honor. The Skrulls had captured a Kree spy who had infiltrated into the Skrulls by using a symbiote.

Warskrulls
A group of genetically-bred Skrulls called the Warskrulls began infiltrating the Shi'ar Empire. They used a Nexus Amplifier to assume total physical discorporation of their targets, adopting their superpowers along with their physical appearance. They captured and replaced the Starjammers with members of their race, as well as key components in government. The Warskrulls, acting under the direction of the paramount among them, posing as a Shi'ar called the Chamberlain, began committing murders and even genocide upon various Shi'ar affiliated races, such as the P!ndyr, in the name of the Shi'ar Empire. One Warskrull replaced the Imperial Consort, Professor X, called himself Warlord, and took mental control over Lilandra, the Majestrix of the Shi'ar. They were eventually defeated by the combined forces of Deathbird and the X-Men and later the Shi'ar vowed to weed out any other Warskrulls.

Infiltrating Earth
Some time later, a Skrull called Paibok the Power Skrull mounted a campaign to invade Earth, using another Skrull called Lyja as an infiltrator. The plan involved secretly replacing the real Alicia Masters, the Thing's blind lover. The plan fell through when she instead seduced the Human Torch and the two eventually married one another. The long-running facade eventually came to light and the group discovered that the real, human Alicia was actually being held captive by the Skrull nation and Lyja defected, having fallen in love with the Human Torch. The Fantastic Four rescued her, but Lyja seemingly died in the process as she sacrificed herself to save Johnny when Paibok attacked.

Paibok later revealed to Devos the Devastator that she was still alive. Paibok, with the assistance of Devos, awoke Lyja from her comatose state and gave her the power to fly and fire energy blasts from her hands (she called herself "Lyja the Lazerfist"). These powers were later revealed to come from a special device implanted in her. Joining them in search of vengeance, the three arrived on Earth, and battled the Torch at Empire State University. The Torch panicked, used his nova flame and destroyed the campus. Alongside Devos and Paibok, Lyja witnessed a battle between the Fantastic Four and an alternate Fantastic Four. However, Lyja still bore feelings for the Torch and once again betrayed her cohorts to side with the Fantastic Four. This ended with the Fantastic Four destroying the "Skrull War World", the Skrulls' largest attack ship.

Cadre K
A group of Skrulls traveled to Earth, where they began plotting to invade the planet once again. They were, however, at some point approached by Apocalypse, who wanted to lure together 12 powerful mutants that he needed to ascend to godhood. At the same time, the body of the Living Monolith, who had been hurled out into the far reaches of space by Thor, is found and brought back to Earth. On Earth, a mutant Skrull named Fiz snuck into Xavier's mansion to tell them urgent news of trouble: the Skrulls have allied themselves with someone powerful and the only thing he knows is that there are 12 mutants that cannot be harmed and that something terrible is going to happen. Fiz also reveals the existence of a subtype of Skrulls that possess innate powers like Earth's mutants. Deemed outcasts by the other Skrulls, they were hunted by the Empire.

After the eventual defeat of Apocalypse, Professor X went into space to train them, giving them the name Cadre K. Cadre K and Xavier returned to Earth during the Ruul's attempt to overtake the planet by turning it into an intergalactic prison. A wounded Z'Cann attempted to pass on vital information to Rogue. Their physical contact affected Rogue's powers for some time. The information was received and the X-Men were reunited with Bishop.

Annihilation

The Skrull Empire is the first of the major interstellar empires to be invaded by the forces of Annihilus. The Annihilation Wave's superweapon, the Harvester of Sorrow, physically destroys dozens of Skrull planets. In the aftermath, the Skrulls unsuccessfully attempt to convince the Hulkling to become their new Emperor.

The Rise and Fall of the Shi'ar Empire
A group of Warskrulls attacked a remote Shi'ar space station and took it over. Disguised as Shi'ar, they were taken aboard the space station willingly and slaughtered all those aboard, except a few needed to keep working the ship. The group, however was eventually defeated by a group of X-Men (Darwin, Havok, Marvel Girl, Nightcrawler, Professor X and Warpath). These Warskrulls are, however, revealed to be cyborgs.

Secret Invasion
In the Secret Invasion series by Brian Michael Bendis and Leinil Yu, a flailing Skrull Empire, under the leadership of newcomer Queen Veranke, made an all-out effort to infiltrate and conquer Earth. It was revealed that the Skrulls had infiltrated Earth for quite some time by capturing and replacing many of Earth's heroes. They followed this infiltration with their main assault group. This wave of Skrulls then formed new versions of the Super-Skrull, with each possessing the abilities of several different heroes. Their invasion ultimately failed, costing the life of Veranke, and reducing their numbers even further. Even their gods were slain, and the Japanese God of Evil Amatsu-Mikaboshi took over their Pantheon, leading to the events of Chaos War.

Re-establishing the Empire and Infinity
After the events of Secret Invasion, the Skrulls, now reduced in numbers, became very segmented with various factions rising up around Warlords that began plotting to rise back to power by orchestrating events for their own benefit.

During the Infinity storyline, several planets that the Skrulls settled on began being targeted by the Builders and while the Silver Surfer tried to save most of them, the Skrulls' population was once more decimated. Kl'rt the Super-Skrull later represented the Skrull Empire as a member of the Galactic Council. After the Avengers' victory over the Builders and Thanos, Kl'rt becomes the new Emperor of the Skrulls, where they settle on Tarnax II.

Meanwhile, Cadre K had settled on a ranch in South Dakota, while another group of Skrulls remain undercover on Earth as the "Warner" family, who are gathering data for the next Skrull invasion. The Warner family participate in day-to-day life, but end up stranded on Earth, completely cut off from the Empire.

Infinity Countdown
During the search of the Infinity Stones in the Infinity Countdown storyline, Razor reveals the true origin of the Tree of Shadows; according to Razor, the Tree of Shadows was created eons ago by one of the Elders of the Universe known as the Gardener, who tried to bring life to the Null Space and planted it in the Darkforce Dimension. Eventually the Null Space and the Tree of Shadows were discovered by a more prehistoric version of the Shi'ar and the Skrulls, a find that erupted in a war between the two alien races. The war raged until one member of the Shi'ar was able to grasp one of the seeds of the Tree. His physiology, fear and beliefs shaped the birth of the most vicious killing machine the universe had ever seen, the first Raptor and while the Skrulls, being shape-shifters, were still able to hold out against the Shi'ar, they eventually were nevertheless slaughtered by Raptor Prime, a creature of instinct and adaptation which quickly learnt to use their enemies' shape-shifting abilities as well.

Empyre
In the "Road to Empyre," Teddy Altman is made a mysterious offer at the cost of leaving Billy Kaplan. He accepts the offer which was to become the new ruler of the Kree-Skrull Alliance, adopting the mantle of "Dorrek VIII," and beginning the preparations of invading the Earth for "the final war."

General G'iah, under the alias of "Gloria Warner", sends an encrypted message to the Skrull High Command about the progress of Project Blossom. Her mate, Colonel Klrr, uses the alias of "Carl Warner" and they have three daughters named Alice, Ivy, and Madison. After losing her husband to their handler and rescuing Ivy, General G'iah obtains a sample of a Cotati from a lab while explaining the history of the Kree and the Skrull's feud. At their motel, they are ambushed by a Kree operative. General G'iah leads her daughters to track the assailant to a Kree family. After G'iah's daughters prevent her from retaliating against them, the patriarch of the Kree family that blew up their motel room suddenly receives a message on his Kree-tech cellphone by Dorrek VIII, stating to all Kree and Skrull soldiers in the field that the Kree and Skrull armadas have united to face a common enemy. They are coming to Earth to destroy them as he speaks. The enemy is eventually revealed to be the Cotati, who are returning, as well as the Celestial Messiah. In the Kree/Skrull Alliance, Dorekk VIII has gained Captain Glory, Mur-G'nn, Tanalth the Pursuer, and the Super-Skrull as his inner circle. When the Avengers learned about the Cotati's true motives, they decided to work together to fight the Cotati and prevent them from eliminating all animal life. As Dorekk VII allows the Black Panther to wield the Sword of Space, Captain Glory has a private chat with Tanalth the Pursuer and his scans reveal that she is not a Kree. It is revealed that Tanalth the Pursuer is actually Empress R'Klll in disguise, having survived the destruction of Tarnax IV. When Captain Glory states that her grandson spent too much time with the humans, R'Klll notes that it brought out the Hulking's heroism and states that they will have to do something about that.

Biology
Skrulls are green-skinned reptilian humanoids with large pointed ears, red or green eyes, and chins with several vertical folds in the skin below their mouths. Skrulls are known for genetic and molecular instability and genetic diversity, due to Celestial experimentation creating the Skrull Deviants. The Skrulls are known for their physical malleability and ability to shapeshift to any size, shape, or color at will, taking on the appearance but not the characteristics of other beings and objects. Skrulls are able to assume virtually any form, be it organic (e.g., cows ) or inorganic (e.g., lamps ). As a result, the Skrulls excel at spying and infiltration. Skrulls are also able to use their shapeshifting abilities to form weapons (e.g., blades and clubs) with parts of their bodies, making them dangerous hand-to-hand combatants. Their sexual dimorphism is roughly the same of a human being, with the exception that the males are mostly bald and have no facial hair, while females have full head of greenish-black hair, but their sexual orientation is more complex, since they can change their genders at will. Indeed, Xavin once casually said that, for a Skrull, changing gender is comparable to a human being changing their hair color. As for their reproductive system, just like the other reptilians, the females do not give live birth, but instead lay eggs and the newborns are known as "hatchlings". However, despite being reptilian, the females also possesses hair and mammary glands to nurture their newborn, just like a human being.

The Skrulls later developed the ability to render themselves undetectable when using their shapeshifting abilities, even from telepaths and those with superior senses. Reed Richards discovered a method to use technology to negate this ability and reveal a disguised Skrull's true form.

Courtesy of their advanced technology, the Skrulls have also been able to augment their abilities in certain warriors, such as the Super-Skrull, Power Skrull and the Warskrulls—all elite groups who, with special encoding, are able to emulate the powers as well as the appearance of their biophysical templates or are bestowed entirely unique supertropical abilities all their own (in the case of Paibok).

The Skrulls have been shown to suffer from various diseases. Some Skrulls are born with a defect that makes them unable to shapeshift, however, this defect also enhances their strength to those Skrulls including Titannus, Talos and Raze. The Skrulls can also suffer from cancer, as shown with Kl'rt the Super-Skrull and Prince Klundirk. In an alternate universe, Skyppi suffered from a form of tuberculosis which was common to the Skrull species.

Just like the Kree, the Skrulls were evolutionarily stagnant, unable to evolve. However, over the millennia Skrull mutants have been born with the K-gene as opposed to the Human Mutants X-Gene, meaning that now this might not be the case anymore.

After a Skrull dies, they revert to their original form.

Culture

Language
The Skrull species speak a variety of languages and dialects, including: Skrullos, Skrullian, the Irdu dialect, the Tligi dialect and the Frti dialect. While the Prime Skrulls had their own language, however, it was forgotten as their species was extinct.

Art
Since the Skrulls are a warrior race, it is hard for them to grasp almost any kind of representational art.

Religion
The main Skrull religion is the "Dard'van Sect", their "True Faith", which worships Sl'gur't and Kly'bn. It is unknown about the relation between Zorr'Kiri and the actual pantheon.

In Deadpool vs. Thanos #3, it is revealed that the Skrull equivalent of Hell is called the Shapeless Wastes.

Known Skrulls
 Al'arok – A Skrull who posed as a Zenn-Lavian known as "Tallian Pay" to gain entrance for Skrulls to Shalla-Bal; deported after his attempt to kill the Silver Surfer failed; committed suicide to prevent capture by Kree who had disabled the Skrull starship he was on.
 Anelle – Skrull princess and the only child of Emperor Dorrek VII and Empress R´Klll; heir to the Skrull Empire and the mother of the Hulkling (Dorrek VIII/Teddy Altman). Killed when Galactus consumed their Throneworld.
 Aptak – A Skrull trapped in a female Waziliah form by the Hyper-Wave Bomb. She is the lover of Nenora.
 Akilll – A Skrull representative to witness the fate of Phoenix, on trial by the Shi'ar. 
 Ard'ran – A fourth-rank Skrull engineer who participated in the Skrull's invasion upon San Francisco. She had the telepathic abilities of any telepathic member of the X-Men.
 Bag'le – 
 Bartak – A Skrull who posed as the Silver Surfer.
 Baryn – A Skrull who helped in liberating Prince Dezan.
 Bellok – Member of the "S-Men." Also known as the Ice-Boy.
 Broodskrulls – A group of Brood/Skrull hybrids.
 Cadre K – A group of "K-Class Deviant Skrulls" who have powers and physical appearances unlike other Skrulls. They oppose the killing of their kind by the Empire in the name of racial purity. Cadre K was led by Professor X.
 Fiz – A mutant Skrull who journeyed to Earth to join the X-Men. Fix assisted in the battle against Apocalypse. He led Skrull mutants to rebel against the Slave-Drivers. He left Earth with the others and Professor X to find a new homeworld. Fiz could alter his size and mass.
 Goroth – A Skrull that has stretching abilities.
 Nuro – A Skrull that has the ability to elongate his body.
 R'Tee – A Skrull that has the ability to project spikes from his arms and head.
 Spunje – A Skrull that has the ability to absorb and reflect energy.
 Z'Cann – The leader of Cadre K. She was captured by the Intergalactic Council. Z'Cann is a telepath.
 Carnival – Slavers who were using a carnival to attract and capture humans as slaves. They were encountered by the New Mutants and fled in their starship, but left one behind.
 Gragnon – Skrull slaver.
 Rekxorm Sebastian  – Skrull slaver.
 Ch'gra – A delegate in Queen Veranke's court.
 Ch'rith  – A Skrull Lieutenant who participated in the Skrull's invasion upon San Francisco.
 Chrell – A Skrull Commander entrusted by Queen Veranke to train her army and slay the Hulkling. Chrell possessed the combined powers of Mister Fantastic, the Invisible Woman, the Human Torch, and the Thing. Chrell self-destructed trying to eliminate the Young Avengers and the Runaways.
 Criti Noll – A Skrull who was chosen to pose as Hank Pym. She tried to warn the diner owner that served her good food about the upcoming Skrull invasion, only to be killed by a Skrull posing as Dum Dum Dugan and some Skrulls posing as S.H.I.E.L.D. agents.
 Criti Noll Clone – A clone of Criti Noll who posed as Hank Pym during the Secret Invasion. She not only has the abilities matching Henry Pym, she also has the combined powers of the Black Panther, Quicksilver and the Vision.
 Dakr't – 
 Dalx – Skrull diplomat and cultural attaché.
 De'Lila – A Skrull thief who sought the Inorganic Technodrone. She was then taken by the Skrulls.
 Dezan – The brother of Dorrek VII. He was long imprisoned due to his pacifist nature and branded a traitor to the Skrull Empire.
 De'zean – The father of Xavin and the current Prince of Tarvax VII. 
 Dharri – A Skrull Lieutenant.
 Dorrek I – A Skrull King who reigned during the Skrull's first encounter with the Kree.
 Dorrek VII – Former Emperor of the Skrulls. Killed by his wife, Empress R'Klll.
 Dro'ge – The Skrull Royal Priest of Science. A Skrull scientist who experimented on the Illuminati and discovered the advancements that allowed the Empire to infiltrate Earth on a massive scale.
 Dzirot – A Skrull who participated in the Skrull invasion upon San Francisco. He died in battle.
 Ethan Edwards – A Skrull who was a Marvel Comics pastiche of Superman.
 Evh'ser – A Skrull adjutant who participated in the Skrull invasion upon San Francisco.
 Ewe'fareek – Uncle to Xavin in the comic book Runaways.
 Flaw – A Skrull who served in the Shi'ar's Death Commandos.
 Fremn – 
 Fry'lu – A Skrull telepath who existed during the reign of Dorrek VII.
 Galan – The Skrull Priest of Science.
 Godkiller – A specially-bred female Super-Skrull that has the powers of Battleaxe, Thundra, Titania, and Volcana. She was also genetically modified to wield Beta Ray Bill's hammer, Stormbreaker.
 Gorth – A Skrull who was the governor of a Skrull colony.
 Granok – 
 Grrix – The Skrull Ambassador at S.W.O.R.D.
 H. Warren Craddock Impostor – A Skrull who impersonated H. Warren Craddock.
 Hagar – A Skrull who serves as the High Judicator in the Skrull courts.
 Henkor – 
 H'kurrek – Fanatical Skrull Commander that commanded the part of the Secret Invasion directed against the X-Men.
 Hokk Algol – A Skrull who is a member of the War Crimes Tribunal.
 Host – 
 H'rpra – A Skrull who posed as the Mockingbird.
 Hs'fld – 
 The Hulkling (Dorekk VIII/Teddy Altman) – Theodore "Teddy" Altman, a Kree/Skrull hybrid, the son of Anelle and the Kree Captain Mar-Vell. He is a member of the Young Avengers, with the codename "the Hulkling".
 The Intelligencia – A Skrull being that was a composite of the greatest Skrull minds. It was created by the Skrulls to serve as their version of the Supreme Intelligence.
 Jaketch – A Skrull who served as an apprentice executioner of the Skrull jury.
 Jaq – 
 Jash – A Skrull Lieutenant who participated in the Skrull invasion upon San Francisco.
 Jazinda – A Skrull bounty hunter and the daughter of Kl'rt the Super-Skrull.
 Jora'thrll – A Skrull who participated in the Skrull invasion upon San Francisco.
 K'eel R'kt – A Royal Science Officer of the Skrull Empire and only survivor of the Builders' destruction of the Skrull planet Hy'lt Minor. He was saved by the Silver Surfer and transported to the orbital headquarters of S.W.O.R.D., where he offered his services to them against the war with the Builders.
 K'and'rr – A Skrull Commander of the 7th Fleet.
 K'arr'N – 
 K'rtem – A Skrull who was an old comrade of Z'Reg.
 K'Targh<ref name="ReferenceI">Fantastic Four Annual #24. Marvel Comics.</ref> –  
 The Knights of the Infinite – A group of Kree/Skrull hybrids who believed in a prophecy about uniting the two empires and becoming their protectors.
 Dorrek Supreme – The group's leader and the first wielder of the sword "Excelsior".
 M'ryn - A member of the group who founded the prophecy and father of Mur-G'nn. Killed by the wizard Moridun to be used as body for the latter.
 K'kyy – A female member of the group. She assisted in kidnapping Dorrek VIII in order for the latter to become King of the new Empire.
 Lan-Zarr – A member of the group. He guided Dorrek VIII through the test to see if he was Dorrek Supreme reincarnated.
 Mur-G'nn – A female member of the group. She assisted in kidnapping Dorrek VIII.
 Varra – A female member of the group. She is killed by Moridun, who wanted to possess the Wiccan.
 K'vvvr – A Skrull Commander who is the son of K'and'rr. He led the Skrull attack upon Wakanda.
 Kalamari – A Skrull General and ally of Paibok the Power Skrull.
 Kalxor – A Skrull who serves as a Commander for Dorekk's armada.
 Karant Kiar – A Skrull Prelate of the Skrull Empire's 7th Quadrant who was a witness at the trial of Galactus.
 Karza – 
 K'thron –
 Kerth – A Skrull who was a slave of the Broker.
 Kholdsor – 
 Khn'nr – A Skrull who posed as the original Captain Marvel. He turned against the other Skrulls.
 Kl'rt the Super-Skrull – A Skrull who had the combined powers of the Fantastic Four and became the first Super-Skrull.
 Kly'bn – The last surviving Skrull Eternal, who became a Skrull God.
 Korya – A female Skrull that is the lover of the Yeti.
 Kradhal – 
 Kravo – 
 Kreddik – 
 Krellek Council – 
 Krillik – 
 Krimonn the Power Prism – A Skrull transformed into a sentient power object after a failed coup d'état.
 Kylak – 
 Kylor – A Skrull Governor who was a competitor for the title of Skrull Emperor.
 Lyja – A Skrull who infiltrated the Fantastic Four and married Johnny Storm while impersonating Alicia Masters.
 Magnitude – A Super-Skrull who has the combined powers of the Banshee, Havok, Polaris, and Sunfire. He was sent to infiltrate the Point Men until he was exposed and killed by Delroy Garrett.
 Meg'ror – 
 Melugin –
 Moloth - A Skrull who is the handler of G'iah and Klrr.
 Morfex – A Skrull who is a member of the Star Masters.
 Morrat – A Skrull Warlord who is responsible for the death of Franklin Storm.
 Mrok – A Skrull soldier.
 M'Lanz – A Skrull Warbride, she was tasked to stop Tel-Kar from retreating his symbiote (Venom) and getting a Skrull bio-weapon after Tel-Kar killed her two sisters. She teamed up with Eddie Brock as the Sleeper to defeat Tel-Kar. 
 Muraitak – A Skrull that joined the Xandarian Nova Corps and served under Queen Adora.
 Myrn – A Skrull who is a longtime friend of Zabyk and Dezan and the creator of the Hyper-Wave Bomb. After Myrn had Zabyk don an insulated armor that is said to protect him from the bomb's effects, Myrn was killed by Zabyk.
 N'ala – 
 Nenora  – A former Skrull spy that was trapped in Kree form after being hit by a Hyper-Wave Bomb. She is the lover of Aptak.
 Nogor – A Skrull who posed as Longshot. He is the talisman of the Skrulls and the representation of the Skrulls' Gods.
 Nuro – 
 Orf – 
 Pagon – A Skrull who posed as Elektra after Siri's demise. Killed by Echo as part of a suicide mission.
 Paibok the Power Skrull –
 Pitt'o Nili – A Skrull who posed as Captain America (and was brainwashed to be him) who came from a downed ship in the Savage Land. Killed by Shanna the She-Devil after being hit by a poisonous dart that had a huge effect on Skrulls.
 The Prime Skrull – Only surviving member of the original non-Deviant Skrull race.
 The Prime Ten – Ten unnamed Skrulls who sought to obtain Mister Fantastic's matter/energy transmitter.
 Ptakr – 
 Purnlr – A Warskrull who was killed in battle with the Kree.
 R'Tee – 
 Rachman – 
 Raksor – A Skrull who oversaw the Phoenix trial.
 Rale – 
 Raze – A Skrull bounty hunter who cannot shapeshift, but is capable with hand-to-hand combat, athletic abilities, and carries an assortment of knives and guns. He is the brother of Vranx.
 Replica – A young female Skrull who was part of the Guardians of the Galaxy.
 Ripan – A Skrull who was a second-in-command to Kylor.
 R'Klll – Wife of Dorrek VII. She killed her husband and took over the Empire in his place. She was apparently killed when Galactus consumed Tarnak IV but turned up alive, having posed as Tanalth the Pursuer.
 R'Kin – A short Skrull who served as fleet mechanic. Even though he is small, he has super-strength.
 Rl'nnd – Son of Rm'twr. Rl'nnd is an undercover X-Skrull agent participating in the Secret Invasion. He has displayed the combined powers of several X-Men. Killed by Ms. Marvel.
 Rm'twr – Father of Rl'nnd. He was killed by Ms. Marvel.
 Ryga'a – Wife of Kree Soh-Larr and mother of Dorrek Supreme.
 S'Bak – A Skrull Baroness.
 Samuel J. Skrull – 
 Sar T'llrk – A Skrull "Soul Shepherd" who participated in the Skrull invasion upon San Francisco. Killed by Cyclops.
 S'Byll – A Skrull Empress who restored the Skrull's shapeshifting ability.
 Sarnogg – A Skrull who is the son of Kl'rt.
 The Sensational Hydra – A Skrull spy that works for HYDRA.
 She-Thing Impostor – An unnamed Skrull who posed as the She-Thing. Killed by the Skrull Kill Krew.
 Siri – A Skrull who impersonated Elektra. She was killed by the real Elektra.
 Skragg – A Skrull pirate/mercenary that served Thanos.
 The Skrull Beatles – Skrulls who posed as members of the Beatles.
 John the Skrull – The last surviving member of the Skrull Beatles. A member of MI: 13.
 Skrull-X – A Skrullian robot who can mimic the powers of the X-Men in a manner similar to Mimic.
 The Skrulls of Kral – A group of Skrulls that come from the planet Kral.
 "Skrullverine" – An unnamed Skrull working for Apocalypse who was used to replace Wolverine at the time when Apocalypse turned Wolverine into the Horseman Death. This Skrull was later killed by Death.
 Skypii – An elderly Skrull mechanic who was friends with Hercules 2300. Often assumed female form and was working as a human female model when he and Hercules first met. As the "retirement plan" for Skrull workers was execution, he went into hiding in the form of a human female. Skypii chose a statue of Hercules to be his "death-form" in eternal tribute to his friend.
 Sl'gur't – A Skrull Deviant who became a Skrull Goddess and mate to Kly'bn.
 Ssrov – A Skrull Dropshift Captain who participates in the Skrull invasion upon San Francisco.
 St'kr – 
 Syrro – A Skrull major.
 Talos the Untamed – A Skrull who cannot shapeshift. However, the mutation that left him unable to shapeshift gave him an enormous amount of strength.
 Tarna – A Skrull who is part of the Agents of Cosmos. She had a symbiote partner until Agent Venom became enraged and nearly killed it while stealing a ship, burning it with the ship's engine.
 Tenelle – 
 Titannus – A Skrull who cannot shapeshift, but has been bio-engineered to possess immense strength and regeneration ability.
 Trall – 
 Trl'k – 
 Valth – 
 Velmax (Effigy) – Founder of the superhero team the First Line; posing as a human hero, Effigy, with shape-shifting powers.
 Veranke – The current Skrull Queen. She posed as Spider-Woman. Killed by Norman Osborn.
 V'lrym – 
 Vranx – A Skrull technology user and brother of Raze.
 Warpriest Kh'oja – A ruthless fanatic and an enemy of Power Pack.
 The Warners – A group of Skrull spies posing as an ordinary American family to make way for a future invasion.
 G'iah - A Skrull General who operated on Earth as Gloria Warner.
 Klrr - A Skrull Colonel and G'iah's wife, who operated on Earth as Carl Warner. He was later killed by Moloth.
 Alkss - The middle daughter of G'iah and Klrr, who operated on Earth as Alice Warner.
 Ivy Warner - The youngest daughter of G'iah and Klrr.
 Madison Warner - The oldest daughter of G'iah and Klrr.
 The Warskrulls – A bunch of genetically-bred Skrulls who infiltrated the Shi'ar's culture to obtain power for the Skrull race.
 Wor'il – Delegate in Dorrek's War Council.
 Xalxor – 
 Xavin – A Super-Skrull in training and a member of the teenage superpowered group the Runaways. Xavin is the child of Prince De'zean of the Skrull planet Tarvax VII. 
 X'iv – A Super-Skrull assassin sent to assassinate the Hulkling. She has the combined powers of Daredevil, Elektra, and Cloak and Dagger.
 Yorak – 
 Y'tll – 
 Zabyk – A Skrull warrior who was a childhood friend of Dezan and Myrn. He had Myrn construct a Hyper-Wave Bomb to use on his enemies. Under the advice of Myrn, he donned an insulated armor (even shifting his form to fit the unusual shape of its interior) that would protect him against its effects, but it failed, leaving his contorted body frozen inside and placing him in agony.
 Zankor – An alien retconned into a Skrull. 
 Zedrao – A high-ranking Skrull General, notable for being on good terms with Earth's metahumans. Gave the dying Mar-Vell the Royal Skrull Medal of Honor, the highest honor in the Skrull military, for being a worthy rival.
 Zirksu – A Skrull spy who assumed the alias of Diabolik.
 Zkrodd – 
 Z'Reg (the Crusader) – A Skrull who deserted his kind. He was formerly a member of the Initiative as the second Crusader.
 Zuhn – A Skrull who was the partner of Velmax.
 Zorr'Kiri – The Skrull Goddess of Love. Killed by Gorr the God Butcher.

Reception
 In 2018, CinemaBlend included Skrulls in their "5 Marvel Villains We'd Love To See In Black Panther 2" list.
 In 2022, CBR.com ranked The Skrulls 9th in their "Black Knight's 10 Strongest Villains" list.

Other versions
Amalgam
In Amalgam Comics, the Skrull are the native inhabitants of Mars (having crossed DC's Green Martians with the Skrulls). Mister X (the Martian Manhunter and Professor X) is an example of a Martian Skrull.

Earth X
In the alternate universe limited series Earth X, Thanos dwelled in the Realm of the Dead with the entity Death. It is revealed his mother was a Skrull and Death used her secret to make him believe that Death was his mother.

Hulk: The End
In the one-shot issue Hulk: The End, an alien Recorder robot tells an elderly Bruce Banner, the last human on the planet, that the death of the human race was widely celebrated throughout the universe, so much so that the Kree and the Skrulls had settled their differences in celebration.

Squadron Supreme
The Skrullian Skymaster (real name Skymax) is a founding member of the Squadron Supreme and possesses abilities matching the Super-Skrull from Earth-616. The character first appeared in flashback in Squadron Supreme #1 (1989), and appeared in more detail in Squadron Supreme: New World Order.

In an alternate reality to that in which most Marvel Comics stories take place, the Skrull Empire has been at war with the Kree Empire. In an attempt to end the bloodshed, the Skrull Empire created a means to imbue their soldiers with extraordinary powers to vanquish the Kree. Skymax was the first and the only soldier subjected to the experiments, because the World Devourer destroyed the Skrull homeworld. Sk'ym'x was in the vicinity of Earth when his starship malfunctioned. He was rescued by American astronaut Joe Ledger (who would later become Doctor Spectrum). Grateful for his rescue, Skymax gave Ledger a Power Prism, which Ledger used to become the costumed adventurer Doctor Spectrum, while Skymax became the costumed adventurer known as the Skrull. Skymax and Ledger both became founding members of the Squadron Supreme, and Skymax remained with the team until member Tom Thumb repaired his ship, allowing him to return to space. Skymax realized that the damage to his ship was beyond repair despite Tom Thumb's efforts, and he chose to remain on Earth in secret, searching for any possibility of other Skrull survivors. Not finding any, Skymax concluded that he was indeed the last of his race; he remained on Earth.

After the Squadron Supreme returned from their adventures on Earth-616, the sorcerer Mysterium sent the surviving members to retrieve others to help in the rebellion against the Global Directorate. Doctor Spectrum was sent after "the Watcher" and discovered Skymax. Renaming himself the Skrullian Skymaster and revealing his true origin to Doctor Spectrum, Skymax rejoined the Squadron Supreme and settled with them on Utopia Isle.

In the 2021 "Heroes Reborn" reality, the Skrullian Skymaster was established as a former member of the Squadron Supreme of America. While trying to break up the protests caused by mutants over a bill that would start the Mutant Registration Act, the Skrullian Skymaster killed Mystique with his flame attacks. This caused Rogue to use her life-draining powers to avenge her adoptive mother by killing the Skrullian Skymaster.

Ultimate Marvel
The Skrulls are led by the billion-year-old Skrull Emperor Kl'rt. The Skrulls dislike being confused with the Chitauri whom they call terrorists. They have extremely advanced technology, but have not been observed to shapeshift. These Skrulls were seen only in an alternate timeline in which Reed Richards contacted their world via his teleporter; the events leading to that timeline were altered in Ultimate Fantastic Four #29 so that contact was never made.

MC2
In the MC2 universe, Torus Storm, the son of Lyja and Johnny Storm, is a Skrull/Human hybrid, who inherited the powers of both his parents.

Thirty years into the future
In an alternate timeline set 30 years into the future, the Skrull Empire was united with the Kree Empire under the rulership of Emperor Dorrek VIII and they were successful in eliminating all life on Earth.

What If?
Secret Invasion
On Earth-10021, the Skrulls were victorious in the end of Secret Invasion and the heroes were defeated. In this reality, the Skrulls were coexisting along with the humans on Earth and were seen by humans as people with good intentions. Despite helping the humans in medical care and technology, in reality, they are secretly turning the humans into Skrulls like themselves, including Norman Osborn, who had married Queen Veranke, while the heroes had been hiding in Wakanda, since now they were seen as criminals. In the end, the heroes spread a virus which killed every Skrull and the humans who had been turned into Skrulls, except for Osborn, who had been disguised as Iron Man. Osborn revealed that he had orchestrated the plan all along, but he was killed by Bucky Barnes. The heroes were then taken by the U.S. government as world criminals.

In other media
Television
 The Skrulls have appeared in multiple animated series based on the Fantastic Four, including the 1967 series, the 1978 series, the 1994 series, and the 2006 series Fantastic Four: World's Greatest Heroes.
 The Skrulls appeared in X-Men.
 The Skrulls appeared in Silver Surfer.
 The Skrulls appeared in The Super Hero Squad Show.
 The Skrulls appeared in The Avengers: Earth's Mightiest Heroes.
 The Skrulls appeared in the Avengers Assemble episode "Mojo World".
 The Skrulls appeared in Hulk and the Agents of S.M.A.S.H.Film
Actor Tye Sheridan revealed in a 2019 interview that the Skrulls were originally intended to be the main antagonists in an earlier cut of the live-action film Dark Phoenix, before they were scrapped in favour of the D'Bari when the film underwent reshoots which resulted in the Skrulls being omitted entirely from the finished film.

Marvel Cinematic Universe
The Skrulls appear in media set in the Marvel Cinematic Universe:
 They are introduced in the live-action film Captain Marvel (2019). A faction of Skrulls led by Talos (portrayed by Ben Mendelsohn) are portrayed as victims of a genocidal war waged by the Kree, having come to Earth to seek the aid of renegade Kree scientist Mar-Vell in devising a light-speed engine that could take the Skrulls to safety. On Earth, they meet Maria Rambeau, her daughter Monica, and Nick Fury. After Kree warrior "Vers" learns of her true identity as Carol Danvers, she helps defend Talos, his wife Soren, and the other Skrull refugees from a Kree attack before they leave Earth to find a new planet to settle on.
 In the live-action film Spider-Man: Far From Home (2019), Talos and Soren pose as Fury and Maria Hill on Earth while Fury himself works with a group of Skrulls in space.
 A Skrull appears in a mid-credits scene of the live-action miniseries WandaVision episode "The Series Finale", portrayed by Lori Livingston. They appear in Westview, New Jersey disguised as an FBI agent to inform Monica that an old friend of Maria's needs her help for an upcoming mission.
 Alternate timeline versions of the Skrulls appear in the Disney+ animated series What If...? episode "What If... Thor Were an Only Child?" They attend Thor's gigantic Earth party alongside various other aliens and amuse Thor by assuming his appearance.
 The Skrulls will appear in the upcoming series Secret Invasion, with Mendelsohn returning as Talos.

Video games
 Skrull Governor Kylor, identified as "Emperor", appeared as a boss in the NES Silver Surfer game.
 The Skrulls appeared in Marvel: Ultimate Alliance. When Galactus attacks the Skrulls' homeworld, the heroes are forced to fight his Punishers and Skrulls who refuse to believe that the heroes came to stop Galactus. After helping the Skrull Empress escape the planet, the player has the option of destroying Galactus' Optonic Drills before they destroy the Skrull homeworld. If the player stops the drills, the Skrulls will form a tentative partnership with Earth and will later come to their aid when the Kree threaten to enslave humanity. Otherwise, the loss of their homeworld will destabilize the sector of space it originally occupied and the Kree and Skrull go to war for decades, at the cost of millions of lives.
 The Skrulls appeared in Fantastic Four: Rise of the Silver Surfer.
 The Skrulls appeared in Marvel Super Hero Squad: The Infinity Gauntlet.
 The Skrulls appeared in Marvel Heroes.
 The Skrulls appeared in the Fantastic Four virtual pinball game for Pinball FX 2.
 The Skrulls would have appeared in a first person Skrull-centric Avengers action game that was planned by THQ Studio Australia to coincide with the release of the live action film of the same name in 2012. The game would have featured Iron Man, Captain America, the Hulk, and Thor as the main characters, with Black Widow, Hawkeye, War Machine, and Ms. Marvel appearing as unlockable characters. The story, loosely based on Secret Invasion rather than the film, was penned by veteran comic writer Brian Michael Bendis. Though a fair amount of progress was made on the game, it was ultimately cancelled after THQ Studio Australia was closed down.
 The Skrulls appeared in Marvel Avengers: Battle for Earth''.

References

External links
 The Skrulls at Embracechange.org
 
 
 Skrull article on FFPlaza.com
 Skrull entry on MarvelDirectory.com
 Skrulls at Comic Vine
 Skrull at Marvel Cinematic Universe Wiki

 
Characters created by Jack Kirby
Characters created by Stan Lee
Comics characters introduced in 1962
Fiction set in the Andromeda Galaxy
Fictional humanoids
Fictional warrior races
Marvel Comics alien species
Marvel Comics characters who are shapeshifters
Marvel Comics Deviants
Villains in animated television series